The Squash competition at the World Games 2013 took place from August 2 to August 4, in Cali in Colombia, at the Canas Gordas Comfenalco Club.

Schedule
All times are Colombian Time (UTC−5)

Participating nations

 Australia (4)
 Brazil (1)
 Canada (2)
 Colombia (4)
 France (3)
 Germany (3)
 Guyana (1)
 Great Britain (4)
 Hungary (2)
 India (3)
 Japan (2)
 Jamaica (1)
 Kuwait (1)
 Malaysia (3)
 Mexico (1)
 Netherlands (1)
 Pakistan (1)
 Peru (1)
 United States (2)

Medals table

Medals summary

References

 
2013 World Games
Squash records and statistics